Andrei Medvedev (born 31 August 1974) is a Ukrainian former professional tennis player. Medvedev reached the final of the 1999 French Open, the French Open semifinals in 1993, and won four Masters titles during his career, achieving a career-high ranking of world No. 4 in May 1994.

Career

In 1991, Medvedev won the junior singles title at the French Open.

As a 17 year old the following year, Medvedev won his first two ATP-tour titles in Genoa and Stuttgart (where he beat world no. 2 Stefan Edberg, and finished the season ranked within the world's top 25. 

His most successful tournament was the Hamburg Masters (formerly the German Open), which he won three times (1994, 1995 and 1997). He reached a career-high singles ranking of World No. 4.

In the late 1990s, Medvedev's form and results began to flounder until he unexpectedly reached the final of the 1999 French Open where — ranked 100 — he defeated Dinu Pescariu, Pete Sampras, Byron Black, Arnaud Di Pasquale, Gustavo Kuerten and Fernando Meligeni  en route.  Medvedev dominated the first two sets of the final against Andre Agassi before Agassi mounted a come-from-behind victory, which allowed him to complete a career Grand Slam. Afterwards, Medvedev did not score further notable results, and retired from the tour in 2001.

One main rival of Medvedev's was Sergi Bruguera. While their head-to-head record ended deadlocked at 5–5, Bruguera was able to win their two most important matches — the semi-finals and quarter-finals of the 1993 and 1994 French Opens respectively, with Bruguera winning both matches in straight sets. 

In the French Open tournament, Medvedev lost six times to the eventual champion (1992–95, 1997 and 1999).

Personal life

His sister, Natalia Medvedeva, formerly a top 25 player on the WTA Tour, partnered with Andrei to represent Ukraine at the seventh Hopman Cup in 1995, finishing as runners-up to Germany's Boris Becker and Anke Huber (Medvedev's girlfriend back then) in the final.

Andrei Medvedev is not related to another ATP tennis pro, Daniil Medvedev.

Grand Slam finals

Singles: 1 (1 runner-up)

Masters Series finals

Singles: 5 (4 titles, 1 runner-up)

Career finals

Singles: 18 (11 titles, 7 runners-up)

Doubles: 1 (1 runner-up)

Team: 1 (1 runner-up)

Singles performance timeline

Top 10 wins

Main achievements
1991 Won junior French Open, beating Thomas Enqvist in the final
1992 Won the title in Stuttgart (Outdoor) with the strongest draw in the history of the event
1993 Semifinalist at the French Open and Masters in Frankfurt
1994 Won the titles in Monte Carlo and Hamburg (Super 9 events)
1995 Won the title in Hamburg
1997 Won the title in Hamburg title for the third time in four years
1999 Reached the final of the French Open

References

External links

 
 
 
 Official website of Andrei Medvedev

French Open junior champions
Sportspeople from Kyiv
People from Monte Carlo
Soviet male tennis players
Ukrainian expatriates in Monaco
Ukrainian male tennis players
1974 births
Hopman Cup competitors
Living people
Grand Slam (tennis) champions in boys' singles